Eric Cartman is a central character from the adult animated series South Park.

Cartman may also refer to:
 Cartman (band), an Australian band 1997–2003
 Cartman (surname), a surname

South Park 

 Other characters in South Park with the surname Cartman
 Cartman Sucks, 
 Liane Cartman, a central character from the adult animated series South Park

See also

 Carman (disambiguation)
 Carmen (disambiguation)
 Cartmanland